Compromisu por Asturies (Commitment to/for Asturies in Asturian language) is an Asturian political organization of left-wing and Asturian nationalist ideology. Compromisu por Asturies is the result of the merge of two previous political parties: Unidá and Bloque por Asturies.

History
Compromisu was created on June 23, 2012 after the convergence process opened by the Bloque por Asturies and Unidá Nacionalista Asturiana, with the addition of some independents. Compromisu also supports and participates in Podemos.

References

External links
Official site of Compromisu por Asturies

Political parties in Asturias
Asturian nationalist parties
Socialist parties in Spain
Left-wing nationalist parties